Ellis Fjord is a long narrow fjord between Breidnes Peninsula and Mule Peninsula in the Vestfold Hills of Antarctica. It was photographed by the Lars Christensen Expedition (1936–37), and plotted by Norwegian cartographers as a bay and a remnant lake which were called "Mulvik" (snout bay) and "Langevatnet" (long lake) respectively. Analysis by John Roscoe of air photos taken by U.S. Navy Operation Highjump (1946–47) showed these two features to be connected. The feature was renamed Ellis Fjord by Roscoe after Edwin E. Ellis, aerial photographer on U.S. Navy Operation Highjump flights over this area.

Further reading 
 J Grey, J Laybourn-Parry, RJG Leakey, and A McMinn, Temporal patterns of protozooplankton abundance and their food in Ellis Fjord, Princess Elizabeth Land, Eastern Antarctica, stuar. Coast. Shelf Sci.], vol. 45, no. 1, pp. 17–25, Jul 1997
 McMinn A, Heijnisj H, Harle K, McOrist G., Late-Holocene climatic change recorded in sediment cores from Ellis Fjord, eastern Antarctica, The Holocene. 2001;11(3):291-300. https://doi.org/10.1191/095968301671577682 
 McMinn, A., Gibson, J., Hodgson, D. et al., Nutrient limitation in Ellis Fjord, eastern Antarctica,  Polar Biol 15, 269–276 (1995). https://doi.org/10.1007/BF00239847
 Kirkwood, J.M., Burton, H.R., Macrobenthic species assemblages in Ellis Fjord, Vestfold Hills, Antarctica, Mar. Biol. 97, 445–457 (1988). https://doi.org/10.1007/BF00397776
 McMinn, Andrew; Heijnisj, Henk; Harle, Kate; McOrist, Gordon;, Late-Holocene climatic change recorded in sediment cores from Ellis Fjord, eastern Antarctica  [2001], Holocene ISSN : 0959-6836
 A. McMinn, J. J. Bloxham & J. Whitehead (1998), Modern surface sediments and non‐deposition in Ellis Fjord, eastern Antarctica, Australian Journal of Earth Sciences, 45:4, 645–652, https://doi.org/10.1080/08120099808728419
 Gibson, J. (1999), The role of ice in determining mixing intensity in Ellis Fjord, Vestfold Hills, East Antarctica, Antarctic Science, 11(4), 419–426. https://doi.org/10.1017/S095410209900053X
 Australian Antarctic Division, Locations of samples from Organic Lake, Deep Lake and Ellis Fjord in the Vestfold Hills, Antarctica, Dataset

External links 
 Ellis Fjord on USGS website
 Ellis Fjord on AADC website
 Ellis Fjord on SCAR website
 Ellis Fjord on marineregions.org
 Ellis Fjord area map

References 

Fjords of Princess Elizabeth Land
Ingrid Christensen Coast